Roberto Álvarez Álvarez (born 2 August 1940) is a Spanish retired footballer who played as a midfielder, and a current coach.

Playing career
Born in Villamartín de Sil, Páramo del Sil, El Bierzo, León, Álvarez started his senior career with SD Ponferradina in 1962, in Tercera División. After a spell at Cultural y Deportiva Leonesa, he moved to Segunda División side CD Mestalla in 1965.

Álvarez made his professional debut on 28 December 1965, starting and scoring his side's third through a penalty kick in a 3–3 home draw against Recreativo de Huelva. He appeared rarely for the club during his two-year spell, and subsequently joined CD Tenerife before retiring.

Managerial career
Álvarez started his managerial career with Levante UD in 1988, taking the side back to the second tier after an absence of seven years at first attempt. He was sacked in March 1990, after a winless run of seven games.

In May 1990 Álvarez was appointed manager of fellow league team Palamós CF. After 22 games in charge, he was relieved from his duties.

In 1992 Álvarez was named manager of his first club Ponferradina. In charge for two full seasons, he suffered relegation to the fourth level in his second before resigning; he would return to the club later in the same year.

Álvarez was subsequently appointed at UDA Gramenet (two spells), CP Almería and Levante.

References

External links

Aúpa Deportiva profile 

1940s births
Living people
People from El Bierzo
Sportspeople from the Province of León
Spanish footballers
Footballers from Castile and León
Association football midfielders
Segunda División players
Tercera División players
SD Ponferradina players
Cultural Leonesa footballers
Valencia CF Mestalla footballers
CE Europa footballers
CD Tenerife players
Spanish football managers
Segunda División managers
Segunda División B managers
Tercera División managers
CF Reus Deportiu managers
Terrassa FC managers
UE Lleida managers
Levante UD managers
Palamós CF managers
SD Ponferradina managers
CP Almería managers